Pasarell is a surname. Notable people with the surname include:

Charlie Pasarell (born in 1944), Puerto Rican tennis player
Emilio J. Pasarell (1891–1974), Puerto Rican short story writer
Stanley Pasarell (born in 1948), Puerto Rican tennis player

See Also
Passarell